is a Japanese former butterfly swimmer. She competed in two events at the 1972 Summer Olympics.

References

External links
 

1955 births
Living people
Japanese female butterfly swimmers
Olympic swimmers of Japan
Swimmers at the 1972 Summer Olympics
Place of birth missing (living people)
20th-century Japanese women